McIntyre Promontory is a promontory having the ground plan of a sharp V pointed toward the north, with steep cliffs on either flank, forming a part of the Bush Mountains at the head of Ramsey Glacier in Antarctica. It was discovered and photographed by U.S. Navy Operation Highjump on Flight 8A of February 16, 1947, and named by the Advisory Committee on Antarctic Names for Captain Eugene C. McIntyre, United States Marine Corps, copilot on this flight.

References

Promontories of Antarctica
Landforms of the Ross Dependency
Dufek Coast